David Colin Baskcomb Beaumont,   (born 16 August 1942) was High Commissioner to Botswana from 1995 to 1998.

He was educated at St Benedict's School, Ealing. He joined the CRO in 1961. He served in Nairobi, Bahrain, Accra, Kathmandu and  Addis Ababa. He was Head of Protocol at the FCO from  1989 to 1994; and  First Assistant Marshal of the Diplomatic Corps from 1993 to 1994.

References

People educated at St Benedict's School, Ealing
High Commissioners of the United Kingdom to Botswana
1942 births
Living people
Companions of the Order of the Bath